The Emerald Buddha (or  ) is an image of the meditating Gautama Buddha seated in a meditative posture, made of a semi-precious green stone (jasper rather than emerald or jade), clothed in gold. and about  tall. The image is considered the sacred palladium of Thailand. It is housed in the Temple of the Emerald Buddha (Wat Phra Kaew) on the grounds of the Grand Palace in Bangkok.

Origin myths

Sinhalese origin according to the Jinakalamali 
The legend of the Emerald Buddha is related in number of sources such as Jinakalamali, Amarakatabuddharupanidana, and in particular Ratanabimbavamsa or The Chronicle of the Emerald Buddha written in Pali by Brahmarājaprajña in the 15th century (but the oldest extant manuscript dates only to 1788). The story is a mix of fact and fables with some variations to the story. According to the legend, the Emerald Buddha was created in 43 BCE by a sage named Nagasena in the city of Pataliputra (today's Patna), India. Nagasena allegedly had the help of the deities, Vishnu and Indra, 500 years after Buddha attained Nibbana. He was said to have predicted:

This figure of the Buddha is assuredly going to give to religion the most brilliant importance in five lands, that is in Lankadvipa (Sri Lanka), Ramalakka, Dvaravati, Chieng Mai and Lan Chang (Laos).

Arrival in Cambodia according to Cambodian Royal Chronicles 
According to Cambodian Royal Chronicles as compiled by Ros Chantrabot, the legends state that after remaining in Pataliputra for three hundred years, The Emerald Buddha was taken to Sri Lanka to save it from a civil war. The emerald Buddha then somehow arrived in Cambodia, giving its name place known as Russey Keo. When the Thais attacked Angkor Wat in 1432 (following the ravage of the bubonic plague), the Emerald Buddha was taken to Ayutthaya, Kamphaeng Phet, Laos and finally Chiang Rai, where the ruler of the city hid it until it was found in 1434.

Burmese Chronicles 
A version of the legend stated that in 457, King Anuruth of Burma sent a mission to Ceylon to ask for Buddhist scriptures and the Emerald Buddha, in order to support Buddhism in his country. These requests were granted, but the ship lost its way in a storm during the return voyage and somehow landed in Cambodia.

History

Discovery in Lan Na 

Historical sources indicate that the statue surfaced in northern Thailand in the Lan Na kingdom in 1434. One account of its discovery tells that lightning struck a chedi in Wat Pa Yia (Bamboo Forest Monastery, later renamed Wat Phra Kaew) in Chiang Rai, revealing a Buddha covered with stucco inside. The Buddha was then placed in the abbot's residence, who later noticed that stucco on the nose had flaked off, revealing a green interior. The abbot removed the stucco and found a Buddha figure carved from a green semi-precious stone, which became known as Phra Kaew Morakot or in English the Emerald Buddha. ("Emerald" refers to its "green colour" in Thai, not its composition.) Some art historians describe the Emerald Buddha as belonging to the Chiang Saen Style of the 15th century CE, which would mean that it is of Lan Na origin.

The legend reports that King Sam Fang Kaen of Lan Na wanted it in his capital of Chiang Mai, but the elephant carrying it insisted on three separate occasions on going instead to Lampang. This was taken as a divine sign, and the Emerald Buddha stayed in Lampang in a specially-built temple (now Wat Phra Kaeo Don Tao) for the next 32 years. In 1468, it was moved to Chiang Mai by King Tilokaraj, where it was kept in a niche in a large stupa called Chedi Luang.

Presence in Laos in the 16th century 
The Emerald Buddha remained in Chiang Mai until 1552, when it was taken to Luang Prabang, then the capital of the Lao kingdom of Lan Xang. Some years earlier, the crown prince of Lan Xang, Setthathirath, had been invited to occupy the vacant throne of Lan Na as his mother was the daughter of the king of Chiang Mai who had died without an heir. However, Prince Setthathirath also became king of Lan Xang when his father, Photisarath, died. He returned home, taking the revered Buddha figure with him.

In 1564, King Setthathirath moved it to Vientiane, which he had made his new capital due to Burmese attacks and where the Buddha image was housed in Haw Phra Kaew. The Buddha image would stay in Vientiane for the next 214 years.

Settlement in Siam after the victory of General Chao Phraya Chakri in 1779 
In 1779, the Siamese General Chao Phraya Chakri invaded Laos, looted Vientiane and took the Emerald Buddha to Siam. It was installed in a shrine close to Wat Arun in Thonburi, the new capital of Siam. Chao Phra Chakri then seized the throne for himself and founded the Chakri Dynasty of the Rattanakosin Kingdom, where he would later be titled King Rama I. He shifted his capital across Chao Phraya river to its present location in Bangkok, and constructed the new Grand Palace including Wat Phra Kaew within its compound. Wat Phra Kaew was consecrated in 1784, and the Emerald Buddha was moved with great pomp to its current home in the ubosot of the Wat Phra Kaew temple complex on 22 March 1784.

Temples of the Emerald Buddha: visual journey

Description

The Buddha image is made of a semi-precious green stone, described variously as jade or jasper rather than emerald, as "emerald" here refers to its colour rather than the stone. The image has not been analyzed to determine its exact composition or origin.

The Buddha is in a seated position, with the right leg resting on the left one, a style that suggest it might have been carved in the late Chiang Saen or Chiang Mai school, not much earlier than the fifteenth century CE. However, the Meditation attitude of the statue was not popular in Thailand but looks very much like some of the Buddha images of southern India and Sri Lanka, which led some to suggest an origin in India or Sri Lanka.

Seasonal decoration
The Emerald Buddha is adorned with three sets of gold seasonal decorations: two were made by Rama I, one for the summer and one for the rainy season, and a third made by Rama III for the winter or cool season. In 1996 to celebrate the Golden Jubilee of King Bhumibol Adulyadej, the Bureau of the Royal Household commissioned a replica set of the seasonal decorations to be made in all the same materials. This new set was funded entirely by donations. The original set, which were made over 200 years ago, were retired and are on display at the Museum of the Emerald Buddha Temple in the Middle court of the Grand Palace.

The decorations are changed by the King of Thailand, or a senior member of the royal family in his stead, in a ceremony at the changing of the seasons – in the 1st Waning of lunar months 4, 8 and 12 (around March, August and November).

For the three seasons, there are three sets of decorations for the Emerald Buddha:
 Hot/summer season from March to August – a stepped, pointed crown (makuṭa); a breast pendant; a sash; a necklace, a number of armlets, bracelets and other items of royal attire. All items are made of enameled gold and embedded with precious and semi-precious stones.
 Rainy season from August to November – a pointed headpiece of enameled gold studded with sapphires; a gold-embossed monk's robe draped over one shoulder (kasaya).
 Cool/winter season from November to March – a gold headpiece studded with diamonds; a jewel-fringed gold-mesh shawl draped over the rainy season attire.

The sets of gold clothing not in use at any given time are kept on display in the nearby Pavilion of Regalia, Royal Decorations, and Thai Coins on the grounds of the Grand Palace, where the public may view them.

Ceremonies
Early in the Bangkok period, the Emerald Buddha was occasionally taken out and paraded through the streets to relieve the city and countryside of various calamities (such as plague and cholera). This practice was discontinued during King Rama IV's reign as it was feared that the image could be damaged during the procession and the king's belief that; "Diseases are caused by germs, not by evil spirits or the displeasure of the Buddha".

The Emerald Buddha also marks the changing of the seasons in Thailand, with the king presiding over seasonal ceremonies. In a ritual held at the temple three times a year, the decoration of the statue is changed at the start of each of the three seasons. The astrological dates for the ritual ceremonies, at the changing of the seasons, followed are in the first waning moon of the lunar calendar, months 4, 8 and 12 (around March, July, and November). Rama I initiated this ritual for the hot season and the rainy season; Rama III introduced the ritual for the winter season. The decoration which adorn the image, represent those of monks and the king, depending on the season, an indication of its symbolic role "as Buddha and the King", which role is also enjoined on the king who formally dresses the Emerald Buddha himself. The costume change ritual is performed by the king who is the most elevated master of ceremonies for all Buddhist rites. During the ceremony, the king first climbs up to the pedestal, cleans the image by wiping away any dust with a wet cloth, and changes the gold headress of the Emerald Buddha. The king then worships nearby while an attendant performs the elaborate ritual of changing the rest of the decorative garments. The king also sprays holy water, which is mixed with the water rinsed from the wet cloth used to wipe the dust of the image, upon his subjects waiting outside the ordination hall. Previously this was a privilege afforded only to the princes and officials who were attending the ceremony (uposatha) inside the ubosot.

Ceremonies are also performed at the Emerald Buddha temple at other occasions such as Chakri Day (6 April 1782), a national holiday to honour the founding of the Chakri dynasty. The king and queen, an entourage of the royal family, as well as the prime minister, officials of the Ministry of Defence and other government departments, offer prayers at the temple.

See also
 Grand Palace
 Phra Phuttha Sihing
 Wat Phra Kaew

References

External links 
 
 Grand Palace and Emerald Buddha at emerald-buddha.com

15th-century sculptures
Buddha statues in Thailand
Grand Palace
Northern Thai culture
Stone Buddha statues